Ranik Ultimate Fighting Federation (RUFF) is the first Chinese mixed martial arts (MMA) organization sanctioned by the General Administration of Sport of China.  The winners of the title fights will be crowned as the national MMA champions of China in their respective weight classes.  RUFF held its first event in August 2011 in Shanghai, before presenting in Chongqing, Hohhot, Nanjing, and Sanya.  In February 2013 RUFF awarded Championship belts in five weight classes, at their Superfight event.  Together with the Championship belt, each winner was awarded 1,000,000 RMB.  RUFF along with Mandt Bros. Productions produced and aired a 10 episode reality series RUFF: Journey leading up to the Superfight.  A new episode will air each week and will be nationally televised across China with TV viewership of over 30 million, over 10 episodes.

Background
Founded in 2007 by businessmen Joel Resnick.  From the outset, fighter safety was of paramount importance to RUFF.   The company brought in well-known and C.O.M.M.A.N.D-certified referee, Jerin Valel to officiate at all events and to train local referees and judges from RUFF 1-8; and has continued its dedication to safety and fairness through training of referees and judges with the world's #1 referee Herb Dean.  On December 6, 2010, RUFF announced its partnership with China's Wushu Association of the General Administration of Sport, allowing them to award National Champions.  RUFF is the first organization with the ability to award the title of National Champion in MMA.  Gaining credibility through their partnership with the government, RUFF was able to sign exclusive contracts with many of China’s best fighters.

In August 2011, RUFF Genesis was held in Shanghai.  RUFF announced its partnership with the L.A. based Mandt Bros. Productions Company in January, 2012.

Current Operations
On September 8, 2012, RUFF made headlines when RUFF 5 was aired LIVE on Chinese TV.  The event also played online on PPTV and QQ/Tencent and garnered an audience of over 1.3 million viewers.  It was also the first time a combat event was televised live in China. RUFF 4 was re-broadcast in the days before RUFF 5 and gained a total viewership of 4.25 million.  Having recently signed deals with satellite and regional broadcasters, RUFF's #s continue to grow reaching 8 million viewer for RUFF 7 and livestream #s hitting 2 million views; with a total potential audience of well over 1.3 billion.

RUFF has also been featured on the internet programs such as MMA Inside the Cage, MMA H.E.A.T and MMAMADHouse.

Weight Divisions

▪ Flyweight: 55 kg

▪ Bantamweight: 60 kg

▪ Featherweight: 65 kg

▪ Lightweight: 70 kg

▪ Light Heavyweight: 93 kg

2013 Champions

List of Events

References

Organizations established in 2007
2007 establishments in China
Mixed martial arts organizations